The results of the 2012 3rd Tarang Cine Awards, the awards presented annually by the Tarang entertainment television channel to honor artistic and technical excellence in the Oriya language film industry of India ("Ollywood"), are as follow:

 Lifetime Achievement – Sarat Pujari
 Best Film – Chocolate
 Best Director – Sushant Mani -Chocolate
 Best Actor – Anubhav Mohanty  - Balunga Toka
 Best Actress – Archita Sahu -Chocolate
 Best Lyricist – Bapu Goswami  -Chocolate
 Best Singer – Babusan Mohanty -Chocolate
 Best Editor – Biren Jyoti Mohanty -Chocolate
 Best Dialogues – Bapu Goswami - Chocolate
 Best Cinematography – Apurba Kishore Bir  - Jianta Bhuta
 Best Comedian – Papu Pom Pom -Balunga Toka
 Best Actor (Debut) – Harihar Das -Mu Premi Mu Pagala
 Best Actress (Debut) – Anubha Sourya -Mu Premi Mu Pagala
 Best Actor (in a Negative Role) – Samaresh Routray - Loafer

References

Tarang Cine Awards
Tar